Xeromunda is a genus of small air-breathing land snails, terrestrial pulmonate gastropod mollusks in the subfamily Helicellinae  of the family Geomitridae, the harry snails and their allies. 

Species of snails in this genus make and use love darts as part of their mating behavior.

Species
Species within the genus Xeromunda include:
 Xeromunda alticola Hausdorf, 1995
 Xeromunda candiota (L. Pfeiffer, 1849)
 Xeromunda durieui  (L. Pfeiffer, 1848)
 Xeromunda peloponnesia Hausdorf, 1990
 Xeromunda thessalica Hausdorf, 1990
 Xeromunda vulgarissima  (Mousson, 1859)

References

 Kobelt, W. (1892). Literaturbericht. Nachrichtsblatt der Deutschen Malakozoologischen Gesellschaft, 24 (7/8): 149-152. Frankfurt am Main
 Hausdorf, B. (1990). Die Xeromunda-Arten des griechischen Festlandes (Gastropoda: Hygromiidae). Archiv für Molluskenkunde, 119 (4/6): 107-131. Frankfurt am Main
 Bank, R. A. (2017). Classification of the Recent terrestrial Gastropoda of the World. Last update: July 16th, 2017

External links
 
 Monterosato, T. A. di. (1892). Molluschi terrestri delle isole adiacenti alla Sicilia. Atti della Reale Accademia di Scienze, Lettere e Belle Arti di Palermo. 3rd Series, 2: 1-34

Geomitridae